Gavardo may refer to:

 Gavardo, a town and comune in the province of Brescia, Lombardy, Italy
 Arimanno da Gavardo, Roman Catholic cardinal and Bishop of Brescia
 Biesse Carrera Gavardo (died 1115), Italian UCI Continental team founded in 2018
 Carlo Alberto de Gavardo Prohens (1969–2015), a Chilean motorist and motorcyclist